Irene Lagunas (born October 20, 1973 in Chilachapa, Guerrero, Mexico) is a Mexican luchadora, better known under the ring name La Seductora (Spanish for "The Seductress"). She is currently working for the Mexican professional wrestling promotion Consejo Mundial de Lucha Libre (CMLL) portraying a ruda wrestling character. Originally working under a mask, Lagunas was unmasked after losing a match on August 1, 2014.

Professional wrestling career
The woman known as "La Seductora" began training for a professional wrestling career in 1992 under Chico Hernández, who also coined the ring name "La Seductora", to go with her personality of being both charming and evil in the ring. Her career was put on hold for a number of years to have children, but once her two girls were old enough she returned to the ring, competing for Consejo Mundial de Lucha Libre (CMLL). On April 27, 2007 La Seductora competed to in a tournament to crown a new Mexican National Women's Champion when previous champion Lady Apache won the higher ranked CMLL World Women's Championship. Princesa Blanca was one of 14 women competing in a torneo cibernetico to qualify for the finals. The torneo cibernetico was won by Marcela and Princesa Sujei, eliminating La Seductora. In the summer of 2012 La Seductora began to develop a rivalry with the masked tecnica Goya Kong, a storyline many speculated may lead to a Luchas de Apuestas ("Bet Match") between the two where both would risk their masks on the outcome of the match. When the match was finally announced it did not just include the two women risking their masks, but an additional eight women who would all risk their hair on the outcome of the annual Infierno en el Ring steel cage match. Besides Goya Kong and La Seductora the match included La Amapola, Dalys la Caribeña, Dark Angel, Estrellita, Lady Apache, Marcela, Princesa Blanca and Tiffany. The match came down to Goya Kong and Princesa Blanca as everyone else, including La Seductora, escaped the ring to keep their hair or mask safe. On August 1, 2014, at El Juicio Final, La Seductora and Princesa Blanca were defeated by Marcela and Princesa Sugehit in a double Lucha de Apuestas; as a result La Seductora was forced to unmask and reveal her true identity.

Luchas de Apuestas record

References

1973 births
Living people
Masked wrestlers
Mexican female professional wrestlers
Professional wrestlers from Guerrero